China's high-speed railway network is by far the longest in the world. As of December 2022, it extends to 31 of the country's 33 provincial-level administrative divisions and exceeds  in total length, accounting for about two-thirds of the world's high-speed rail tracks in commercial service. Over the past decade, China’s high-speed rail network grew rapidly according to ambitious railway plans issued by the State.

Overview
In 2008, the Ministry of Railways announced plans to build  of high-speed railways with trains reaching normal speeds of 350 km/h. China invested $50 billion on its high-speed rail system in 2009 and the total construction cost of the high-speed rail system is $300 billion. The main operator of regular high-speed train services is China Railway High-Speed (CRH).

China's conventional high-speed railway network is made up of four components:

 a national grid of mostly passenger dedicated HSR lines (PDLs),
 other regional HSRs connecting major cities,
 certain regional "intercity" HSR lines, and
 other newly built or upgraded conventional rail lines, mostly in western China, that can carry high-speed passenger and freight trains.

National High Speed Rail Grid

"Four Vertical and Four Horizontal" network

The centerpiece of the MOR's expansion into high-speed rail is a national high-speed rail grid that is overlaid onto the existing railway network. The 2004 Railway Network Plan called for four lines running north-south (verticals) and four lines running east-west (horizontals) by the year 2020 that would connect population centers in economically developed regions of the country. The 2008 Revisions to the Railway Network Plan extended the length of the Beijing-Shenzhen HSR to Hong Kong and the Shanghai-Changsha HSR to Kunming. Each line in the 4+4 national HSR grid is over 1,400 km in length, except the Qingdao-Taiyuan Line which is 873 km in length. Apart from the Hangzhou–Shenzhen HSR (Ningbo-Shenzhen section) and Shanghai–Chengdu HSR (Nanjing-Chengdu section), which were the first railways to connect those cities and carry both passenger and freight, the other six lines are all passenger-dedicated lines.

With the completion of the Beijing–Shenyang high-speed railway, this backbone network was fully completed in January 2021.

 Completed lines  Partially completed lines.

Four North-South HSR corridors and constituent lines

Four East-West HSR corridors and constituent lines

"Eight Vertical and Eight Horizontal" network

In 2016, the National Development and Reform Commission (NDRC) announced the plans to extend the almost completed "Four Vertical and Four Horizontal" network to a new "Eight Vertical and Eight Horizontal" network. The new network comprises eight north-south ("vertical") corridors and eight east-west ("horizontal") ones, almost doubling the route length.

A corridor may consist of two or more parallel lines that take different routes between the same cities, branch and connector lines, and in some cases, connecting lines and lower-speed lines. The Beijing-Shanghai HSR corridor, one of the verticals, comprises the preexisting Beijing-Shanghai HSR, which runs through Tianjin, Jinan, Bengbu, Nanjing, Wuxi and Suzhou, as well as a new high-speed passenger dedicated line from Beijing to Shanghai via Tianjin, Dongying, Weifang, Linyi, Huaian, Yangzhou, and Nantong, as well as HSRs connecting Nanjing, Hefei and Shanghai with Hangzhou. Some corridors consist of a single HSR line; the Shanghai-Kunming HSR corridor, one of the horizontals, is essentially the Shanghai–Kunming High-Speed Railway by another name.

The national HSR mainlines in the 8+8 corridor grid are generally electrified, double-tracked, passenger-dedicated HSR lines built to accommodate train speeds of 250–350 km/h, but corridors also make use of intercity and regional HSR lines with speeds of 200 km/h as well as certain regular speed railways. The Qingdao-Yinchuan corridor includes the Taiyuan–Zhongwei–Yinchuan Railway, which is partially single-track with speeds of only 160km/h.

Eight vertical lines

Eight horizontal lines

Other Regional high-speed rail lines
The 2008 Revisions to Railway Network Plan listed regional railways in Jiangxi, Sichuan and the Northeast. The 2016 Revision lays out 10 new regional railways in eastern China, four in the Northeast, seven in central China, and five in western China. These are also considered high-speed rail though they are not part of the national HSR grid or Intercity High Speed Rail. However several HSR lines planned and built as a regional high-speed railway under the 2008 Revisions have since been incorporated into the 8+8 national grid.

 Completed lines  Partially completed lines. Click [show] for details.

High-speed intercity railways
They are built with the approval of the central government but are financed and operated largely by local governments with limited investment and oversight from the China Rail Corporation. Some intercity lines run parallel to national grid high-speed rail lines but serve more stations along the route.

The 2004 Railway Network Plan arranged for intercity lines around the Bohai Rim, Yangtze and Pearl River Deltas. The 2008 Revision to the Railway Network Plan designated Changsha, Wuhan, Zhengzhou, Chengdu, Chongqing, Xian and coastal Fujian metropolitan areas for intercity rail development. The 2016 Revision to the Railway Network Plan identifies the Shandong Peninsula, coastal Guangxi, Harbin-Changchun, southern Liaoning, central Yunnan, central Guizhou, the northern slopes of Tian Shan, Yinchuan, Hohhot-Baotou-Ordos-Yulin as additional metro regions for intercity rail.

 Completed lines  Partially completed lines. Click [show] for details.

Class I national railways 

 Completed lines  Partially completed lines. Click [show] for details.

See also 

 List of railway lines in China

References

External links
Interactive railway map of China

High-speed rail in China